The list of shipwrecks in June 1941 includes ships sunk, foundered, grounded, or otherwise lost during June 1941.

1 June

2 June

3 June

4 June

5 June

6 June

7 June

8 June

9 June

10 June

11 June

12 June

13 June
For the loss of the Norwegian coaster Ala on this day, see the entry for 17 May 1941

14 June

15 June

16 June

17 June

18 June

19 June

20 June

21 June

22 June

23 June

24 June

25 June

26 June

27 June

28 June

29 June

30 June

Unknown date

Notes

References

1941-06